A prostration (Pali: panipāta, Skt.: namas-kara, Ch.: , , Jp.: raihai) is a gesture used in Buddhist practice to show reverence to the Triple Gem (comprising the Buddha, his teachings, and the spiritual community) and other objects of veneration.

Among Buddhists prostration is believed to be beneficial for practitioners for several reasons, including:
an experience of giving or veneration
an act to purify defilements, especially conceit
a preparatory act for meditation
an act that accumulates merit (see karma)

In contemporary Western Buddhism, some teachers use prostrations as a practice unto itself, while other teachers relegate prostrations to customary liturgical ritual, ancillary to meditation.

Theravada Buddhism
In the Pali canon, laypersons prostrating before the then-living Buddha is mentioned in several suttas.  In Theravada Buddhism, as part of daily practice, one typically prostrates before and after chanting and meditation. On these occasions, one typically prostrates three times: once to the Buddha, once to the Dhamma, and once to the Sangha.  More generally, one can also prostrate before "any sacred object of veneration."

Theravada Buddhists execute a type of prostration that is known as "five-point veneration" (Pali: patitthitapanca) or the "five-limbed prostration" (Pali: pañc'anga-vandana) where the two palms and elbows, two sets of toes and knees, and the forehead are placed on the floor.  More specifically:

In Myanmar (Burma), prostrations are accompanied by the common Buddhist prayer, known as okāsa.

In Thailand, traditionally, each of the three aforementioned prostrations are accompanied by the following Pali verses:

In Theravadin countries such as Sri Lanka, when one goes before one's teacher, in order to "open one's mind up to receive instructions," one bows and recites the phrase, "Okāsa ahaṃ bhante vandāmi" ("I pay homage to you venerable sir").

Mahayana Buddhism

In Zen Buddhism, both half- and full-prostrations are used.  Zen master Robert Aitken writes:

Roshi Philip Kapleau writes:

Zen master Huang Po, of the 9th century, is said to have done prostrations so intensely that he wore a permanent red mark on his forehead.

Vajrayana Buddhism

In Vajrayana Buddhism, prostrations are often performed before meditation or teachings, but can form a separate practice by itself.  Prostrations are seen as a means of purifying one's body, speech and mind of karmic defilements, especially pride. Prostrations are used in tandem with visualization and can be used to express reverence to Guru Rinpoche and others.

For example, in the context of offering homage to Guru Rinpoche, prostrations are to be performed as follows:

This type of prostration is often done 3, 7, 21, or 108 times.  A prostration mala can be used to facilitate counting.

This form of prostration is used with enlightened beings other than Guru Rinpoche as well.

Prostrations done in large numbers (like 100,000) can be part of the preliminary practices to the practice of tantra. Other practices like this can be reciting the Refuge prayer, mandala offerings, Vajrasattva mantras and other practices called ngöndro.

See also

Three Refuges
Five Precepts
Eight Precepts
Uposatha
Puja (Buddhism)
Okāsa
Gadaw, a Burmese form of paying obeisance
Householder (Buddhism)
Dhammika Sutta (Sn 2.14)
Dighajanu Sutta (AN 8.54)
Sigalovada Sutta (DN 31)

Notes

Bibliography

Aitken, Robert (1982). Taking the Path of Zen. NY:North Point Press. .
Aitken, Robert (2002). "Formal Practice: Buddhist or Christian" in Buddhist-Christian Studies (2002), Vol. 22, pp. 63–76.  Available on-line at: http://www.thezensite.com/ZenEssays/Miscellaneous/FormalPractice.htm
Indaratana Maha Thera, Elgiriye (2002). Vandana: The Album of Pali Devotional Chanting and Hymns. Penang, Malaysia:Mahindarama Dhamma Publication. Available on-line at: http://www.buddhanet.net/pdf_file/vandana02.pdf.
Kapleau, Phillip (1989a). The Three Pillars of Zen: Teaching, Practice and Enlightenment. NY: Anchor Books. .
Kapleau, Philip (1989b). Zen: Merging of East and West. NY:Anchor Book. .
Khantipalo, Bhikkhu (1982). Lay Buddhist Practice: The Shrine Room, Uposatha Day, Rains Residence (The Wheel No. 206/207). Kandy, Sri Lanka:Buddhist Publication Society. Also transcribed (1995) and available on-line at: http://www.accesstoinsight.org/lib/authors/khantipalo/wheel206.html.
Tromge, Jane (1995). Ngondro Commentary: Instructions for the Concise Preliminary Practices of the New Treasure of Dudjom / compiled from the teachings of His Eminence Chagdud Tulku. Junction City, CA:Padma Publishing. .

External links
A Holy Quest in Tibet: Prostrate, and Miles to Go
Buddhist Bowing as Contemplation
Buddhism: Prostrations (video) Buddhism: Prostrations Part II (video) by Ven Thubten Chodron
Prostrating from Tibet to India
Tibetan Prostration (animation)

Buddhist devotion
Tibetan Buddhist practices
Vajrayana practices
Gestures of respect
Bowing